Kaimai is a former New Zealand parliamentary electorate, from 1978 to 1996. In 1996 the MP Robert Anderson was selected for the new seat of Coromandel, but retired due to illness, and was replaced by Murray McLean, who won the new seat.

Population centres
The 1977 electoral redistribution was the most overtly political since the Representation Commission had been established through an amendment to the Representation Act in 1886, initiated by Muldoon's National Government. As part of the 1976 census, a large number of people failed to fill out an electoral re-registration card, and census staff had not been given the authority to insist on the card being completed. This had little practical effect for people on the general roll, but it transferred Māori to the general roll if the card was not handed in. Together with a northward shift of New Zealand's population, this resulted in five new electorates having to be created in the upper part of the North Island. The electoral redistribution was very disruptive, and 22 electorates were abolished, while 27 electorates were newly created (including Kaimai) or re-established.

The Kaimai was established by incorporating some suburbs that had belonged to the  electorate, getting the southern part of the abolished  electorate, and gaining Te Puke from the abolished  electorate. Other than Te Puke, population centres of the original electorate included Mount Maunganui, Katikati, Welcome Bay, Maungatapu, Papamoa, and Waihi Beach.

History
National's Bruce Townshend was the Kaimai electorate's representative from its creation in 1978 to his death on 25 April 1987. Whilst general elections have since the  traditionally been held on the last Saturday in November and a by-election is required if the death of an MP occurs more than six months prior to an election, the 1987 was held in August and no by-election was triggered; the earlier election date was a result of Muldoon's July 1984 snap election. Robert Anderson replaced Townshend at the 1987 election. Anderson had been selected as National candidate for the Coromandel electorate in 1996, but withdrew due to cancer.

Members of Parliament
Key

Election results

1993 election

1990 election

1987 election

1984 election

1981 election

1978 election

Notes

References

Historical electorates of New Zealand
Thames-Coromandel District
1978 establishments in New Zealand
1996 disestablishments in New Zealand